Iain Walker (born 6 December 1976) is a British diplomat. Between August 2017 and June 2021, he was the United Kingdom's High Commissioner to Ghana. A law graduate of the University of Dundee, Scotland, Walker worked in the Prime Minister's Delivery Unit under Tony Blair and Gordon Brown, before serving as the as a Director of Finance and Strategy at the Foreign, Commonwealth & Development Office in London.

Early life and education 
Walker attended Hillside Primary and Harris Academy in Dundee. He studied law at the University of Dundee, Scotland and graduated in 1998. He later moved to London where he qualified as a chartered accountant with Ernst & Young (EY) specialising in banking and capital markets.

Career 
Walker has held consulting roles at PricewaterhouseCoopers (PwC) and Ernst & Young (EY) two of the ‘Big Four’ accounting firms in the past. Prior to entering into the public service, Walker worked in Malawi and Kenya for International non-government organisation, then later for the United Nations (UN) in Ethiopia. He returned to London to work in the Prime Minister's Delivery Unit initially for Tony Blair and then subsequently Gordon Brown.

Diplomatic career 
Walker joined the Foreign, Commonwealth & Development Office in 2010. In February 2017, Walker was appointed as the United Kingdom's High Commissioner to Ghana to succeed Jon Benjamin, serving simultaneously as British Ambassador to Benin, Burkina Faso and Togo. His work was to officially commence from August 2017. Before his appointment, he was a Board Member of the Foreign, Commonwealth & Development Office in London serving as a Director of Finance and Strategy. He presented his letter of credence to the President Nana Akufo-Addo on 19 August 2017. He arrived in Ghana within the 60th year of the country's Independence. The  celebration of 60 years of independence and historic ties between the two countries was seen as pivot to foster a stronger UK-Ghana partnership for the next six decades.

Personal life 
Walker has been married to Claire since 2007, they have three children. In 2017, his family relocated along with him to Ghana.

See also 

 British High Commission, Accra
 List of High Commissioners of the United Kingdom to Ghana

References 

Living people
British diplomats
High Commissioners of the United Kingdom to Ghana
Alumni of the University of Dundee
British accountants
1976 births
People educated at Harris Academy